The 716th Bombardment Squadron is an inactive United States Air Force unit.  It was last assigned to the 449th Bombardment Wing at Kincheloe Air Force Base, Michigan, where it was inactivated on 30 September 1977.

The squadron was first activated in May 1943.   After training in the United States, the squadron deployed to the Mediterranean Theater of Operations, where it participated in the strategic bombing campaign against Germany.  The squadron was awarded two Distinguished Unit Citations for its actions during the war. Following V-E Day, the 716th returned to the United States and trained with Boeing B-29 Superfortresses, becoming one of the first bomber units in Strategic Air Command (SAC) before inactivating in August 1946.

The squadron was reactivated by SAC at Kincheloe in 1963 and served with Boeing B-52 Stratofortress aircraft until inactivating.

History

World War II
The squadron was first activated in May 1943 at Davis-Monthan Field, Arizona as one of the four original squadrons of the 449th Bombardment Group.  It trained with Consolidated B-24 Liberators at Alamogordo Army Air Field, New Mexico and Bruning Army Air Field, Nebraska before departing for the Mediterranean Theater of Operations in November 1943.

The squadron assembled at its combat station, Grottaglie Airfield in Southern Italy, in early January 1944, from which it mainly undertook strategic bombing missions.  It attacked oil refineries, communications centers, aircraft factories and industrial facilities in Italy, Germany, Czechoslovakia, Hungary, Romania, Albania and Greece.  It was awarded a Distinguished Unit Citation (DUC) for its actions on 4 April 1944, when the squadron, along with the other elements of the 449th Group, operated without fighter escort in an attack on railroad marshalling yards near Bucharest.   The attacking group was heavily outnumbered by German interceptor aircraft. Despite this, it succeeded in destroying its assigned target and also inflicted heavy losses on the defending fighters.  It was awarded a second DUC for an attack against oil refineries near Ploesti, attacking through heavy smoke that obscured the target area and despite intense enemy fire.

The squadron attacked gun emplacements to support Operation Dragoon, the invasion of southern France in August 1944.  It attacked troop concentrations, bridges and viaducts during Operation Grapeshot, the Fifteenth Army Group offensive in Northern Italy in the Spring of 1945.  Shortly after V-E Day, in May 1945, the squadron returned to the United States.
 
The squadron reformed at Sioux Falls Army Air Field, South Dakota at the end of May.  The squadron then began training with Boeing B-29 Superfortress very heavy bombers.  After V-J Day and the end of the War in the Pacific, the squadron moved to Grand Island Army Air Field, Nebraska, where it became one of the first bomber units of Strategic Air Command (SAC) in March 1946. In August 1946, the 28th Bombardment Group replaced the 449th Group at Grand Island, and the squadron was inactivated and its personnel and equipment were transferred to the 77th Bombardment Squadron on 4 August 1946.

Cold War
In February 1963, The 449th Bombardment Wing was organized at Kincheloe Air Force Base, Michigan, where it assumed the aircraft, personnel and equipment of the discontinued 4239th Strategic Wing. The 4239th was a Major Command controlled (MAJCON) wing, which could not carry a permanent history or lineage, and SAC wanted to replace it with a permanent unit.
As part of this reorganization, the 716th Squadron was activated and assumed the mission, personnel and equipment of the 93d Bombardment Squadron, which was simultaneously inactivated.

One half of the squadron's Boeing B-52H Stratofortresses were maintained on fifteen minute alert, fully fueled and ready for combat to reduce vulnerability to a Soviet missile strike.  In addition, the squadron trained for strategic bombardment missions.  From May 1968 through June 1975, the squadron provided aircrews to support SAC operations in Southeast Asia.  In July 1977, the squadron began to draw down in anticipation of the closing of Kinchloe, and it was inactivated when the base closed in September 1977.

Lineage
 Constituted as the 716th Bombardment Squadron (Heavy) on 6 April 1943
 Activated on 1 May 1943
 Redesignated 716th Bombardment Squadron, Heavy c. 1944
 Redesignated 716th Bombardment Squadron, Very Heavy on 23 May 1945
 Inactivated on 4 August 1946
 Redesignated 716th Bombardment Squadron, Heavy and activated, on 15 November 1962 (not organized)
 Organized on 1 February 1963
 Inactivated on 30 September 1977

Assignments
 449th Bombardment Group, 1 May 1943 – 4 August 1946
 Strategic Air Command, 15 November 1962 (not organized)
 449th Bombardment Wing, 1 February 1963 – 30 September 1977

Stations
 Davis-Monthan Field, Arizona, 1 May 1943
 Alamogordo Army Air Field, New Mexico, 5 July 1943
 Bruning Army Air Field, Nebraska, 12 September-26 November 1943
 Grottaglie Airfield, Italy, c. 6 January 1944 – 15 May 1945
 Sioux Falls Army Air Field, South Dakota, 29 May 1945
 Dalhart Army Air Field, Texas, 24 July 1945
 Grand Island Army Air Field, Nebraska, 8 September 1945 – 4 August 1946
 Kincheloe Air Force Base, Michigan, 1 February 1963 – 30 September 1977

Aircraft
 Consolidated B-24 Liberator, 1943–1945
 Boeing B-17 Flying Fortress, 1945
 Boeing B-29 Superfortress, 1946
 Boeing B-52H Stratofortress, 1963–1977

Awards and campaigns

See also

 B-24 Liberator units of the United States Army Air Forces
 List of B-29 Superfortress operators
 List of B-52 Units of the United States Air Force

References

Notes

Bibliography

 
 
 
 
 
 

Units and formations of Strategic Air Command
Bombardment squadrons of the United States Air Force
Strategic bombing squadrons of the United States Army Air Forces
Military units and formations established in 1943